Werewere Liking  (born 1950, in Cameroon) is a writer, playwright and performer based in Abidjan, Côte d'Ivoire. She established the Ki-Yi Mbock theatre troupe in 1980 and  founded the Ki-Yi village in 1985 for the artistic education of young people.

Her novel Elle sera de jaspe et de corail is a song-novel recounted by an astute misovire (literally 'man-hater' from misos Gr. "hate" and vir Lat. "man") in writing a journal on nine themes as a dialectic between two men wherein the author of the journal imagines a new race of people uninhibited by the historical baggage of patriarchy and colonialism. She is the author of the African feminist theory "misovirism."

She received a Prince Claus Award in 2000 for her contributions to culture and society, and the Noma Award in 2005 for her book La mémoire amputée.

Writing
Her books and plays include:
 La mémoire amputée, Nouvelles Editions Ivoiriennes (2004), 
 Elle sera de jaspe et de corail, Editions L'Harmattan (1983),  - trans. Marjolijn De Jager, It shall be of jasper and coral; and, Love-across-a-hundred-lives (two novels),  University Press of Virginia (2000), 
 La puissance de Um (1979) and Une nouvelle terre (1980) - trans. Jeanne Dingome, African Ritual Theatre: The Power of Um and a New Earth, International Scholars Pubs. (1997),

Further reading
 Simon Gikandi, Encyclopedia of African Literature, Routledge (2002),  - pp. 288–9
 Katheryn Wright, Extending generic boundaries: Werewere Liking's L'amour-cent-vies, in Research in African Literatures, June 2002 accessed at  March 5, 2007
 Don Rubin, World Encyclopedia of Contemporary Theatre: Africa, Routledge (2000),    
 Nicki Hitchcott, Women Writers in Francophone Africa, Berg Publishers (2000),  - focuses on Mariama Bâ, Aminata Sow Fall, Werewere Liking and Calixthe Beyala: see publisher's details   
 Peter Hawkins, Werewere Liking at the Villa Ki-Yi, in African Affairs, Vol.90, No.359 (Apr. 1991), pp. 207–222 - accessed at  March 1, 2007

Notes

External links
 Werewere Liking Gnepo, University of Western Australia
 Werewere Liking and Aesthetics of Necessity, Postcolonial Web

Ivorian dramatists and playwrights
Cameroonian actresses
Cameroonian dramatists and playwrights
Women dramatists and playwrights
1950 births
Living people
Ivorian women writers
Cameroonian women writers
Ivorian actresses
Ivorian novelists
Cameroonian novelists
20th-century novelists
20th-century actresses
20th-century dramatists and playwrights
21st-century novelists
21st-century actresses
21st-century dramatists and playwrights
People from Abidjan
20th-century Cameroonian writers
20th-century Cameroonian women writers
21st-century Cameroonian writers
21st-century Cameroonian women writers
Bassa people (Cameroon)